Chowara is a village in Ernakulam District, Kerala, situated about 5 km North of Aluva Town

Agriculture
Rice is grown and harvested in Chowwera.

See also
 Sreemoolanagaram

References

Populated places in Cumilla District
Villages in Comilla District
Villages in Chittagong Division